Parapercis diplospilus, the doublespot grubfish, is a fish species in the sandperch family, Pinguipedidae. It is found in the Indo-West Pacific: from western Australia to the Indo-Australian archipelago, and the Philippines. This species can reach a length of  TL.

References

Allen, G.R., 1997. The marine fishes of tropical Australia and south-east Asia. Western Australian Museum, Perth, Western Australia. 292 p

Pinguipedidae
Taxa named by Martin F. Gomon
Fish described in 1980